Splicing factor 3B subunit 3 is a protein that in humans is encoded by the SF3B3 gene.

This gene encodes subunit 3 of the splicing factor 3b protein complex. Splicing factor 3b, together with splicing factor 3a and a 12S RNA unit, forms the U2 small nuclear ribonucleoproteins complex (U2 snRNP). The splicing factor 3b/3a complex binds pre-mRNA upstream of the intron's branch site in a sequence independent manner and may anchor the U2 snRNP to the pre-mRNA. Splicing factor 3b is also a component of the minor U12-type spliceosome. Subunit 3 has also been identified as a component of the STAGA (SPT3-TAF(II)31-GCN5L acetylase) transcription coactivator-HAT (histone acetyltransferase) complex, and the TFTC (TATA-binding-protein-free TAF(II)-containing complex). These complexes may function in chromatin modification, transcription, splicing, and DNA repair.

Interactions
SF3B3 has been shown to interact with SF3B1, Transcription initiation protein SPT3 homolog and TAF9.

References

Further reading